A comb is a tool consisting of a shaft that holds a row of teeth for pulling through the hair to clean, untangle, or style it.  Combs have been used since prehistoric times, having been discovered in very refined forms from settlements dating back to 5,000 years ago in Persia. 

Weaving combs made of whalebone dating to the middle and late Iron Age have been found on archaeological digs in Orkney and Somerset.

Description

Combs consist of a shaft and teeth that are placed at a perpendicular angle to the shaft. Combs can be made out of a number of materials, most commonly plastic, metal, or wood. In antiquity, horn and whalebone was sometimes used. Combs made from ivory and tortoiseshell were once common but concerns for the animals that produce them have reduced their usage. Wooden combs are largely made of boxwood, cherry wood, or other fine-grained wood. Good quality wooden combs are usually handmade and polished.

Combs come in various shapes and sizes depending on what they are used for. A hairdressing comb may have a thin, tapered handle for parting hair and close teeth. Common hair combs usually have wider teeth halfway and finer teeth for the rest of the comb.  Hot combs were used solely for straightening hair during the colonial era in North America.

A hairbrush comes in both manual and electric models. It is larger than a comb, and is also commonly used for shaping, styling, and cleaning hair. A combination comb and hairbrush was patented in the 19th century.

Uses 

Combs can be used for many purposes. Historically, their main purpose was securing long hair in place, decorating the hair, matting sections of hair for dreadlocks, or keeping a kippah or skullcap in place. In Spain, a peineta is a large decorative comb used to keep a mantilla in place.

In industry and craft, combs are used in separating cotton fibres from seeds and other debris (the cotton gin, a mechanized version of the comb, is one of the machines that ushered in the Industrial Revolution). A comb is used to distribute colors in paper marbling to make the swirling colour patterns in comb-marbled paper.

Combs are also a tool used by police investigators to collect hair and dandruff samples that can be used in ascertaining dead or living persons' identities, as well as their state of health, toxicological profiles, and so forth.

Hygiene
Sharing combs is a common cause of parasitic infections much like sharing a hat, as one user can leave a comb with eggs or live parasites, facilitating the transmission of lice, fleas, mites, fungi, and other undesirables. Siblings are also more likely to pass on nits to each other if they share a comb.

Making music

Stringing a plant's leaf or a piece of paper over one side of the comb and humming with cropped lips on the opposite side dramatically increases the high-frequency harmonic content of the hum produced by the human voice box, and the resulting spread sound spectrum can be modulated by changing the resonating frequency of the oral cavity. This was the inspiration for the kazoo, a membranophone.

The comb is also a lamellophone. Comb teeth have harmonic qualities of their own, determined by their shape, length, and material. A comb with teeth of unequal length, capable of producing different notes when picked, eventually evolved into the thumb piano and music box.

Types

Chinese combs 

Chinese combs are referred as  when referring to thick-tooth comb and  when referred to thin-tooth comb. A form of  produced in Changzhou is the Changzhou comb; the Palace Comb Factory, also called Changzhou combs Factory, found in the city of Changzhou started to operate since the 5th century and continues to produce handmade wooden combs up to this day. were also introduced in Japan during the Nara period where they were referred by the generic name .

Japanese combs 
Indigenous Japanese  started to be used by Japanese people about 6000 years ago in the Jomon era. In the Nara period, Chinese combs from the Tang dynasty were introduced in Japan. Another form of comb in Japan is the Satsuma comb, which started to appear around the 17th century and was produced by the samurai warriors of the Satsuma clan as a side job.

Liturgical comb 

A liturgical comb is a decorated comb with used ceremonially in both Catholic and Orthodox Christianity during the Middle Ages, and in Byzantine Rite up to this day.

Nit comb

Specialized combs such as "flea combs" or "nit combs" can be used to remove macroscopic parasites and cause them damage by combing. A comb with teeth fine enough to remove nits is sometimes called a "fine-toothed comb", as in the metaphoric usage "go over [something] with a fine-toothed comb", meaning  to search closely and in detail. Sometimes in this meaning, "fine-toothed comb" has been reanalysed as "fine toothcomb" and then shortened to "toothcomb", or changed into forms such as "the finest of toothcombs".

Afro pick
This type of comb has loose, thick teeth and is usually used on kinky or Afro-textured hair. It is longer and thinner than the typical comb, and it is sometimes worn in the hair.

Unbreakable plastic comb
An unbreakable plastic comb is a comb that, despite being made of plastic rather than (more expensive) metal, does not shatter into multiple pieces if dropped on a hard surface such as bathroom tiles, a hardwood floor, or pavement.  Such combs were introduced in the mid-twentieth century.  Today most plastic combs are unbreakable as technology has reached a point of understanding the causation of brittleness in these products.

Modern artisan combs

Modern artisan combs crafted from a wide variety of new and recycled materials have become popular over recent years. Used skateboard decks, vinyl records, brass, titanium alloy, acrylic, sterling silver, and exotic wood are a few of the materials being used.

Gallery

See also
 Hairbrush
 Razor
Uncombable hair syndrome

References

External links

Comb lamellophones
Domestic implements
Early musical instruments
Hairdressing
Toiletry
Articles containing video clips